is a Japanese photographer whose work focuses on beauty across racial lines.  His work is in the style of Laurie Toby Edison.

Education
Gomi graduated Nihon University, Dept. of Photography in 1977. He studied with Laurence Sackman and Michel Benton and then returned to Japan in 1983.

Photography career
Gomi established a company in 1993 called Digitalogue which produces multimedia photography works.  At that time, he began to publish a series of books on photos of women of different races, with an emphasis on anatomical differences, in the style of William Herbert Sheldon's Ivy League nude posture photos.

In 1998, his work focused on the subject of loose socks.

Publications
 Nude of J. (with Toni Meneguzzo) (1991)
 Americans 1.0, Los Angeles 1994 (1994) 
 Americans 1.0 Los Angeles (1994) CD-ROM
 Yellows 2.0 Tokyo 1993 (1994) CD-ROM
 Yellows 3.0 China 1994 (1994)
 Yellows Privacy (1994) CD-ROM
 Yellows Men (with Kaz Katayama) (1995) 
 Yellows: Contemporary Girls (1997) CD-ROM
 Americans 1.0 (1998) 
 Yellows 1.0 1991 (1999)

Notes

External links
Official website

Japanese photographers
Living people
1953 births
Nihon University alumni